Devlali Assembly constituency is one of the 288 Vidhan Sabha (legislative assembly) constituencies of Maharashtra state, western India. This constituency is located in Nashik district.

Geographical scope
The constituency comprises parts of Nashik taluka that come under the Nashik Municipal Corporation viz. ward nos. Ward No. 11 to 13, 15, 17 to 20, the Devlali Cantonment Board, the Bhagur Municipal Council and revenue circles of Girnare, Makhamalabad, Satpur, Nashik, Madsangavi, Shinde, Devlali.

Representatives
 2014: Bapu - Yogesh Babanrao Gholap Shiv Sena (SS).

References

Assembly constituencies of Nashik district
Assembly constituencies of Maharashtra